The Burning Spear Newspaper is a print and online newspaper published by the African People's Socialist Party and affiliated with the African Liberation Movement. The paper is the oldest Black Power newspaper in existence and has published without interruption since the 1960s. The paper was founded in 1968 by party chairman and Uhuru Movement leader Omali Yeshitela (formerly Joe Waller).

The paper seeks to "bring voice to the most oppressed and exploited sectors of the African world", as well as combat "White Power imperialism", "media propaganda", and the "monopoly on the distribution of ideas". Since its inception, the paper has published work by influential Black Power icons including Assata Shakur and others.

History
The newspaper was founded in St. Petersburg, Florida, as a newspaper for the Junta of Militant Organizations (JOMO) in 1968. In its organizational pamphlet, JOMO states that the acronym jomo translated means burning spear. The Burning Spear's first issue was printed on December 22, 1969. Three years later, in 1972, JOMO merged with other Junta members to form the African People's Socialist Party, which to this day publishes the newspaper monthly out of its production and distribution facilities in St. Petersburg, Florida.

References

External links
Burning Spear Newspaper website
Burning Spear newspaper, 1969-2020 in the Florida Digital Newspaper Library

Newspapers published in Florida
African-American newspapers
Newspapers established in 1967
1967 establishments in Florida